In enzymology, an [RNA-polymerase]-subunit kinase is an enzyme that catalyzes the chemical reaction

ATP + [DNA-directed RNA polymerase]  ADP + phospho-[DNA-directed RNA polymerase]

Thus, the two substrates of this enzyme are ATP and DNA-directed RNA polymerase, whereas its two products are ADP and phospho-DNA-directed RNA polymerase.

This enzyme belongs to the family of transferases, specifically those transferring a phosphate group to the sidechain oxygen atom of serine or threonine residues in proteins (protein-serine/threonine kinases). The systematic name of this enzyme class is ATP:[DNA-directed RNA polymerase] phosphotransferase. Other names in common use include CTD kinase, and STK9.

References

 

EC 2.7.11
Enzymes of unknown structure